Jannat is a Moroccan singer. Jannat may also refer to:

Jannah, Muslim concept of paradise
Jannat Shahr, city in Iran
Jannat-e Mortazavi, village in Iran
Jannat, alternate name of Jannatabad, Rafsanjan, village in Iran
Jannat, South Khorasan, village in Iran
Jannat: In Search of Heaven..., 2008 Indian film
Jannat (2018 film), Bangladeshi film 
Jannat (Indian TV series), 2001 Indian television series
Jannat (Pakistani TV series), 2017 Pakistani television serial